Francesco Signori (born 26 October 1988) is an Italian footballer who plays as a midfielder.

Career
Born in Milan, Lombardy, Signori started his career at Lombard club Montichiari.

Sampdoria
In 2007 Signori was signed by Ligurian club Sampdoria in a temporary deal. He also wore no.55 shirt for the first team.

In summer 2008 he was signed by Sampdoria in a definitive deal for €190,000 in a 4-year contract. In the same transfer window Signori was farmed to Foligno.

Vicenza (loan)
One day after Signori received his only national team call-up for the under-21 team, On 7 August he was signed by Serie B club Vicenza Calcio in a temporary deal, with an option to purchase. However, Signori did not made his national youth team debut. His contract was renewed to 30 June 2013 during 2009 financial year.

Modena (loan)
On 16 July 2010 Signori was signed by another Serie B club Modena in a temporary deal. His contract with Sampdoria also renewed to 30 June 2014 during 2010 financial year. Signori returned to Sampdoria at the end of season, which Sampdoria excised the counter-option for €80,000. Signori wore no.88 shirt for Sampdoria in the first half of 2011–12 Serie B. However, Signori returned to Modena again on 3 January 2012 in another temporary deal.  On 26 July the temporary deal was renewed. On 19 June 2013 Modena finally purchased half of the registration rights of Signori for €150,000.

Modena
Signori's contract with Modena effective on 1 July 2013. On 20 June 2014 Sampdoria gave up the remain 50% registration rights of Signori to Modena for free.

Novara
On 1 July 2015 Signori was signed by Novara.

Vicenza
On 30 January 2016 Signori left for Vicenza, with Andrea Mantovani moved to opposite direction. Signori signed a -year contract.

References

External links
 
 Lega Serie B profile 

Italian footballers
A.C. Montichiari players
U.C. Sampdoria players
A.S.D. Città di Foligno 1928 players
L.R. Vicenza players
Modena F.C. players
Novara F.C. players
Venezia F.C. players
Ternana Calcio players
Serie B players
Serie C players
Association football midfielders
Footballers from Milan
1988 births
Living people